Cerocoma festiva is a species of blister beetle in the family Meloidae.

References 

Meloidae
Beetles described in 1837